Clifford "Cliff" Henderson (1895–1984) was the managing director of the National Air Races from 1928 through 1939. Described as "the Barnum of aviation," he obtained sponsors for two of the most well-known air races of the period, the Bendix transcontinental and the Thompson closed-course classics. The Thompson Trophy was first awarded in 1929. The 1929 National Air Races included the first official women-only event, the Women's Air Derby, a cross-country race from Los Angeles to Cleveland, Ohio.  In 1931, he convinced businessman Vincent Bendix to sponsor the Bendix Trophy Race, a transcontinental speed dash open to men and women. Henderson was awarded the L'Ordre de 'Etoile Noire de Benin for his service in World War II as the U.S. Air Force Military Commissioner of Dakar.

With his brother Phillip, Henderson built the Pan-Pacific Auditorium in 1935.  The landmark Streamline Moderne convention center, designed by Los Angeles architects Wurdeman & Becket, was the region's primary indoor venue with 100,000 square feet of exhibition space and seating for up to 6,000. It closed after the 1972 opening of the much larger Los Angeles Convention Center.

Henderson and his brother Randall founded Palm Desert, California in the 1940s, envisioning a modern utopia growing from the scrub.  He built the Shadow Mountain Club in 1948. With its glamorous figure-eight swimming pool and high-dive competitions, the club drew celebrities, presidents, and future residents.

Personal life
Born in Iowa, Henderson graduated from the University of Southern California with a Bachelor of Arts degree in 1917. He served in the 35th Ambulance Unit, in France during World War I, then transferred to the 101st Aero Squadron. After the war, Henderson settled in Los Angeles and promoted aviation, serving as chairman of ground arrangements for the Army's Around the World Flight in 1924 from Clover Field. Becoming Director of Aviation of Los Angeles in 1928, he served as the first manager of the Los Angeles airport system. In that same year Henderson became manager of the National Air Races, promoting aviation with competition trophies, including the Thompson, Bendix and Grieve Trophies. He retired from the National Air Races in 1939. In World War II, Henderson served in the Army Air Corps, rising to the rank of colonel. He was involved in planning the Burma Hump air route, and also served as military governor of Dakar in North Africa.

Henderson was a member of the Quiet Birdmen, a male-only aviators' social club. Henderson was married twice. His first wife, Helen Christine Avery, died in 1929. Henderson married actress Marian Marsh in 1960. He died on March 26, 1984 in Rancho Mirage near Palm Desert.

Legacy

The National Aeronautic Association presents an annual Cliff Henderson Award for Achievement. The award is given to a living individual or group whose vision, leadership, or skill has made a significant and lasting contribution to the promotion and advancement of aviation or space activity. Notable recipients of the Cliff Henderson Trophy include Wesley L. McDonald, Walter J. Boyne, Thomas H. Miller, and Eugene Peyton Deatrick.

In 1978, a bust of Henderson was completed and dedicated in Palm Desert. The bust, by Henry McCann, serves as a tribute to Henderson's role as an early developer of the city.

References

External links

Air races
1895 births
1984 deaths
People from Palm Desert, California
Air shows in the United States
Aviation in the United States